Anne-Marie Van Nuffel (born 22 May 1956) is a Belgian middle-distance runner. She competed in the women's 4 × 400 metres relay at the 1976 Summer Olympics.

References

1956 births
Living people
Athletes (track and field) at the 1976 Summer Olympics
Athletes (track and field) at the 1980 Summer Olympics
Belgian female sprinters
Belgian female middle-distance runners
Olympic athletes of Belgium
Place of birth missing (living people)
Olympic female sprinters
20th-century Belgian women